François-Joseph Amon d'Aby (17 July 1913 – 10 January 2007) was a French-language playwright and essayist in the Côte d'Ivoire.

Life
Amon d'Aby started work in the government archives in 1937, rising to become their director.

He was a pioneer of Ivorian theatre. He wrote plays for several organizations: Le Théâtre Indigène de la Côte d'Ivoire, which he founded with Germain Coffi Gadeau in 1938; the Cercle Culturel et Folklorique de la Côte d'Ivoire, which he, Gadeau and Bernard Dadié founded in 1953; and the Jeunesse Ouvrière Chrétienne [Young Christian Workers' Association]. Though his earlier plays were based upon Ivorian oral literature, his later plays also borrowed from European traditions. Generally moralizing, his plays attacked some traditional social practices (e.g. matriarchy in Kwao Adjoba, or clan parasitism in Entraves) as outdated in a modern society.

Amon d'Aby also edited collections of folk tales, and published several cultural and sociological studies of the Côte d'Ivoire.

Works
La Côte d'Ivoire dans la cité africaine, 1951
Le problème des chefferies traditionnelles en Côte d'Ivoire, 1958
Croyances religieuses et coutumes juridiques des Agni de la côte d'Ivoire, 1960
(ed.) Le théatre populaire en République de Côte d'Ivoire : oeuvres choisies, 1966
La mare aux crocodiles: contes et légendes populaires de Côte d'Ivoire, 1973
Proverbes populaires de Côte d'Ivoire, 1984
Le murmure du roi: recueil de dix contes, 1984

Plays
 Kwao Adjoba. ou Procès du régime matriarchal en Basse Côte d'Ivoire [Kwao Adjoba, or the trial of the Matriarchal System of Lower Ivory Coast], 1953
 Entrave [Shackles], 1955
 La Couronne aux Enchères [The Auction Ring], 1956

References

Further reading
 Bonneau, Richard (1973) "Jean-François Amon d'Aby, dramaturge ivoirien" [Jean-François Amon d'Aby, Ivorean Dramatist], L'Afrique Littéraire 27:10–20
 Bonneau, Richard (1973) "La couronne aux encheres, de Francois-Joseph Amon d'Aby." Eburnea. 61: 38-3

1913 births
2007 deaths
Ivorian dramatists and playwrights
Ivorian male writers
Male dramatists and playwrights
Ivorian essayists
Ivorian writers in French
20th-century dramatists and playwrights
Male essayists
20th-century male writers
20th-century essayists